The Hunter 40 is an American sailboat that was designed by Cortland Steck and first built in 1984.

The design was originally marketed by the manufacturer as the Hunter 40, but is now usually referred to as the Hunter 40-1 or the Hunter 40 Legend, to differentiate it from the unrelated 2012 Marlow-Hunter 40 design, which is sometimes called the Hunter 40-2.

Production
The design was built by Hunter Marine in the United States between 1984 and 1990, but it is now out of production.

Design
The Hunter 40 is a recreational keelboat, built predominantly of fiberglass, with wood trim. It has a B&R rig masthead sloop rig, a raked stem, a reverse transom with a folding boarding ladder, an internally mounted spade-type rudder controlled by a wheel and a fixed fin keel.

The boat is fitted with a Japanese Yanmar diesel engine.

Factory standard equipment included a 110% roller furling genoa, four two-speed self tailing winches, AM/FM radio and cassette player with four speakers, teak and holly cabin sole, two fully enclosed heads with showers, private forward and aft cabins, a dinette table, refrigerator, dual stainless steel sinks and a three-burner gimbaled compressed natural gas stove and oven.

Variants
Hunter 40 Deep Keel
This model displaces  and carries  of ballast. The boat has a PHRF racing average handicap of 105 with a high of 99 and low of 111.
Hunter 40 Shoal Draft
This model displaces  and carries  of ballast. The boat has a PHRF racing average handicap of 108 with a high of 102 and low of 114.

See also
List of sailing boat types

Similar sailboats
C&C 40
Columbia 40
CS 40
Hunter 40.5
Hunter 41
Marlow-Hunter 40

References

External links
Official brochure

Keelboats
1980s sailboat type designs
Sailing yachts
Sailboat types built by Hunter Marine
Sailboat type designs by Cortland Steck